Robert Lawrence Martensen (January 1, 1947, Lake County, Ohio – September 26, 2013, Pasadena, California) was an American physician, historian, and author.

Career and publications

Martensen worked as physician in emergency department and intensive care unit settings and as a professor at Harvard Medical School, University of Kansas Medical Center  and Tulane University, teaching bioethics and medical history. After Hurricane Katrina, he moved to Maryland to work for the National Institutes of Health (NIH) as the director of the Office of History.

He was a recipient of a 2002 Guggenheim Fellowship towards the completion of his book The Brain Takes Shape: An Early History, published in 2004 by Oxford University Press. In 2008, Martensen's book A Life Worth Living: A Doctor's Reflections on Illness in a High-Tech Era was published by Farrar, Straus & Giroux.

Views and experiences
In a 2009 interview with The New York Times, Martensen said health care in the United States left many stakeholders dissatisfied. He said hospital administrators were unhappy because they had to focus on profit, patients felt isolated, and some physicians were quitting because they could not practice medicine in the way they wanted.

Martensen criticized end-of-life care in the United States. While most Americans die in nursing homes or hospitals, Martensen said neither are properly oriented to care for dying patients. In nursing homes, management may not want death to occur on-site, so the individual will be sent to the emergency department, and in a hospital, a dying patient may be subject to intrusive medical technology instead of palliative care (which may result from the incentives and disincentives in health insurance coverage).

Martensen discussed the end-of-life care of both his mother and father. While he was out of town and his mother was in the hospital, her physician called Martensen, saying she had a heart block and he asked if he should put in a pacemaker. Martensen, being a physician, knew which medical questions to ask, and he asked for a modest treatment. The issue was her fluids; after she was hydrated her EKG was normal.

In Martensen's 2008 book, Chapter 7, "Life in the Narrows", discusses the death of his father. Instead of having a bad death (dysthanasia) that can occur in hospitals, Martensen thought his father's death was relatively good. His father was 86, septic, had deteriorating lung function, an advance directive with a DNR, and he had started to receive morphine for air hunger. Alternatively, Martensen's father could have been put on a mechanical ventilator. However, that would have violated both Martensen and his father's wishes. Martensen explained that  As the morphine began to act on Martensen's father, his anxiety from air hunger was lessening and he was still conscious. Martensen told his father he thought that life was slipping away, that he thought it was his time, that he loved him, and that was going to remove the oxygen; Martensen's father replied, "thank you."

Education
Martensen was educated at Harvard University (B.A., 1969), Geisel School of Medicine, Dartmouth (M.D., 1974), and the University of California, San Francisco (M.A. and Ph.D., 1993).

See also
 Futile medical care

References

American emergency physicians
Harvard University alumni
Geisel School of Medicine alumni
University of California, San Francisco alumni
Bioethicists
American historians
1947 births
2013 deaths
American male non-fiction writers